Populus suaveolens, called the Mongolian poplar, Korean poplar and Japanese poplar, is a species of flowering plant in the genus Populus, native to all of northern Asia, the Korean peninsula, the Kurils, and northern Japan. It is a tree reaching 30m.

Forms
The following form is currently accepted:
Populus suaveolens f. baicalensis (Kom.) I.V.Belyaeva & Kovt.

References
 

 

suaveolens
Plants described in 1828
Flora of China
Flora of Japan
Trees of Korea
Flora of the Russian Far East
Flora of Siberia